Solyanka is a rural locality (a selo) in Pologozaynishchensky Selsoviet of Akhtubinsky District, Astrakhan Oblast, Russia. The population was 68 as of 2010. There are three streets.

Geography 
Solyanka is located 37 km northwest of Akhtubinsk (the district's administrative centre) by road. Uzlovaya is the nearest rural locality.

References 

Rural localities in Akhtubinsky District